Tahani Toson  (born ) is a retired Egyptian female volleyball player, who played as a wing spiker.

She was part of the Egypt women's national volleyball team at the 2002 FIVB Volleyball Women's World Championship in Germany, and the 2003 FIVB Volleyball Women's World Cup. On club level she played with Al Ahly.

Clubs
 Al Ahly (2002)

References

External links
 Profile at FIVB.org

1971 births
Living people
Egyptian women's volleyball players
Place of birth missing (living people)